Bill Cooke may refer to:

 Bill Cooke (defensive end) (born 1951), American football defensive end
 Bill Cooke (American football coach), American football coach
 Bill Cooke (footballer) (1888–1950), Australian rules footballer

See also  
 William Cooke (disambiguation)